Morten Ivarsen (born 19 November 1966) is a Norwegian sprint canoeist who competed from the late 1980s to the mid-1990s. He won three medals at the ICF Canoe Sprint World Championships with a gold (K-4 10000 m: 1987) and two bronze (K-1 1000 m: 1987, K-1 10000 m: 1991).

Ivarsen also competed in two Summer Olympics, earning his best finish of eighth in the K-1 1000 m event at Seoul in 1988.

References

1966 births
Canoeists at the 1988 Summer Olympics
Canoeists at the 1996 Summer Olympics
Living people
Norwegian male canoeists
Olympic canoeists of Norway
ICF Canoe Sprint World Championships medalists in kayak